Rochdale Metropolitan Borough Council elections are generally held three years out of every four, with a third of the council being elected each time. Rochdale Metropolitan Borough Council, generally known as Rochdale Borough Council, is the local authority for the metropolitan borough of Rochdale in Greater Manchester, England. Since the last boundary changes in 2022, 60 councillors have been elected from 20 wards.

Political control
From 1889 to 1974 Rochdale was a county borough, independent of any county council. Under the Local Government Act 1972 it had its territory enlarged and became a metropolitan borough, with Greater Manchester County Council providing county-level services. The first election to the reconstituted borough council was held in 1973, initially operating as a shadow authority before coming into its revised powers on 1 April 1974. Greater Manchester County Council was abolished in 1986 and Rochdale became a unitary authority. Political control of the council since 1973 has been held by the following parties:

Leadership
The leaders of the council since 2006 have been:

Council elections

1973 election
1975 election
1976 election
1978 election
1979 election
1980 election
1982 election
1983 election
1984 election
1986 election
1987 election
1988 election
1990 election
1991 election
1992 election
1994 election
1995 election
1996 election
1998 election
1999 election
2000 election
2002 election
2003 election
2004 election
2006 election
2007 election
2008 election
2010 election
2011 election
2012 election
2014 election
2015 election
2016 election
2018 election
2019 election
2021 election
2022 election

Borough result maps

By-election results

1993-1997

1997-2001

2005-2010

2010-2015

References

By-election results

External links
Rochdale Council

 
Local government in the Metropolitan Borough of Rochdale
Council elections in Greater Manchester
Elections in the Metropolitan Borough of Rochdale
Metropolitan borough council elections in England